The 1991 Marshall Thundering Herd football team represented Marshall University as a member of the Southern Conference (SoCon) during the 1991 NCAA Division I-AA football season. Led by second-year head coach Jim Donnan, the Thundering Herd compiled an overall record of 11–4 with a mark of 5–2 in conference play, tying for second place in the SoCon.

Marshall played home games in the newly-opened Marshall University Stadium in Huntington, West Virginia.

Schedule

References

Marshall
Marshall Thundering Herd football seasons
Marshall Thundering Herd football